Eric A. Feige (born April 10, 1961, in Meriden, Connecticut) is an American politician and a Republican member of the Alaska House of Representatives from 2013 to 2015, representing District 6. Feige consecutively served from 2011 until 2013 while it was the District 12 seat.

Education
Feige earned his BS from the United States Military Academy and his PA and MS from Pennsylvania State University.

Elections
 In 2012 Feige was redistricted to District 6, while Republican Representative Alan Dick was redistricted to District 38. Feige won the District 6 August 28, 2012 Republican Primary with 1,373 votes (53.34%), and won the November 6, 2012 General election with 4,879 votes (71.77%) against Democratic nominee Jamey Duhamel.
 2010 When Republican Representative and Speaker of the House John Harris retired and left the District 12 seat open, Feige won the three-way August 24, 2010 Republican Primary by 7 votes, with 812 votes (33.65%), and won the November 2, 2010 General election with 3,166 votes (62.37%) against Democratic nominee Bert Cottle.

References

External links

 Official page at the Alaska Legislature
 Campaign site
 
 Biography at Ballotpedia
 Financial information (state office) at the National Institute for Money in State Politics
 Eric Feige at 100 Years of Alaska's Legislature

1961 births
Living people
Republican Party members of the Alaska House of Representatives
Pennsylvania State University alumni
People from Matanuska-Susitna Borough, Alaska
People from Meriden, Connecticut
United States Army officers
United States Military Academy alumni